Countess Emilia Antwerpiana of Nassau (Antwerp, 9 December 1581 - Landsberg, 28 September 1657) was the sixth and youngest daughter of William the Silent and his third wife, Charlotte of Bourbon.

Biography

Emilia Antwerpiana was her father's last surviving daughter. When her elder sister Louise Juliane married in 1593, she went to live with her in Heidelberg. She was neither beautiful nor did she have any money, and therefore remained unmarried until a later age than was normal for princesses at the time.

On 4 July 1616, Emilia Antwerpiana married Frederick Casimir, Count Palatine of Zweibrücken-Landsberg (1585–1645) and settled with him in Landsberg.

In 1621, Emilia Antwerpiana and Frederick Casimir had to flee Landberg for Strasbourg during the Thirty Years' War.  The flight caused long standing economic problems, and for many years she tried to get access to her inheritance and asked her siblings for money.  Her sister Charlotte Brabantine finally arranged for her to live at the castle Montfort in France.

She was finally able to return to Landberg after the Peace of Westphalia in 1648.

Issue
She had three children:
 Frederick (1617-1617) Died one day after birth 
 Frederick Louis (1619-1681) Married to Juliana Magdalena of Palatinate-Zweibrücken
 Charles Henry (1622-1623) Died as a child

Ancestry

References

Emilia Antwerpiana
1581 births
1657 deaths
Emilia Antwerpiana
Daughters of monarchs